I kantonnement is a 1932 Danish silent comedy film directed by Lau Lauritzen Sr. It features the acting debut of Poul Reichhardt.

Cast
Carl Schenstrøm as Fyrtaarnet
Harald Madsen as Bivognen
Mona Mårtenson
Erling Schroeder
Olga Svendsen
Anton De Verdier
Christian Schrøder
Einar Juhl
Alex Suhr
Johannes Andresen
Christen Møller
Jørgen Lund
Poul Reichhardt

External links

1932 films
1930s Danish-language films
1932 comedy films
Danish black-and-white films
Films directed by Lau Lauritzen Sr.
Danish silent films
Danish comedy films
1930s buddy comedy films